Abidin Ahmad is a Bruneian airman who served as the Commander of the Royal Brunei Armed Forces (RBAF) from 1997 until 1999.

As the first pilots in the Royal Brunei Air Force (RBAirF), him and Jocklin Kongpaw have indirectly contributed to the growth and advancement of RBAirF, where their dedication and open sacrifice have become one of the sources of motivation and inspiration for all ABDB members, especially TUDB, to carry out the tasks and missions required by ABDB and the nation.

Education
On 6 August 1968, the Royal Brunei Malay Regiment (AMDB) experienced a very significant moment when Sultan Hassanal Bolkiah was pleased to present the Pilot Badge for the first time to two local officers, Second lieutenant Abidin Ahmad and Second Lieutenant Jocklin Kongpaw, after completing all domestic and foreign flight training. For the AMDB, this ceremony has also gone down in history as the first time that two local military pilots were successfully produced. At that time, a flight display employing a Bell 206B helicopter at Istana Darul Hana further enhanced the presenting ceremony. The two local pilots demonstrated a very high degree of proficiency and efficiency.

When the two pilots were dispatched to British Executive Air Services Limited, Kidlington, Oxford, United Kingdom, for Basic Flight Training on 14 August 1967, AMDB made history. The two officers also undertook flying school in Sabah, Malaysia, to earn a pilot's license prior to attending training in the United Kingdom. Following basic training, Major Herbert Marshall, commanding officer of the Helicopter Platoon, AMDB, oversaw the two pilots as they conducted 90 hours of Advanced Flight Training in a Bell 206B helicopter. Abidin Ahmad and Jocklin Kongpaw have both served as officers and have flown a variety of Royal Brunei Air Force (TUDB) aircraft in a variety of positions.

Military career
In 1982, Lieutenant colonel Abidin Ahmad also became the first local officer to be appointed as the commanding officer of the Air Branch, AMDB and later handed over the reins of leadership to Lieutenant Colonel Jocklin Kongpaw in 1986. He was also the first TUDB officer to be promoted to major general in 1997 and subsequently appointed as the commander of the Royal Brunei Armed Forces (RBAF). He attended the Asia Pacific Defense Forum in 1999.

Later life
At the 2019 Seri Angkasa Cup, which was hosted at the RBA Golf Club, the retired members of "The Legend" team from the RBAirF under the leadership of Abidin Ahmad successfully defended their title. An iftar celebration with former RBAirF commanders was organized on 2 May 2021, at Rumah Wira Angkasa in Berakas in honor of the blessed month of Ramadan.

Honours
A road in Rimba Air Force Base was named Abidin Boulevard on 22 April 2022. Examples of local and foreign honours awarded to him;
  Order of Paduka Keberanian Laila Terbilang First Class (DPKT) – Dato Paduka Seri
  Sultan Hassanal Bolkiah Medal (PHBS) – (7 August 1968)
  Silver Jubilee Medal – (5 October 1992)
  Royal Brunei Armed Forces Silver Jubilee Medal – (31 May 1986)
  General Service Medal
  Long Service Medal (Armed Forces)
  Proclamation of Independence Medal – (1 January 1984)

References

Bruneian Muslims
Bruneian military leaders
Year of birth missing (living people)
Living people
Place of birth missing (living people)